Cavalcade is a 1933 American epic pre-Code drama film directed by Frank Lloyd. The screenplay by Reginald Berkeley and Sonya Levien is based on the 1931 play of the same title by Noël Coward. The film stars Diana Wynyard and Clive Brook.

The story presents a view of English life during the first third of the 20th century from New Year's Eve 1899 to New Year's Day 1933, from the point of view of well-to-do London residents Jane and Robert Marryot, their children, their close friends, and their servants. Several historical events affect the lives of the characters or serve as background for the film, including the Second Boer War, the death of Queen Victoria, the sinking of the RMS Titanic, and World War I. Throughout the film, the passage of years is indicated by dates on title cards, with a Medieval cavalcade marching in the background.

The film won three Academy Awards, including  Best Picture and Best Director.

Plot
On the last day of 1899, Jane and Robert Marryot, an upper-class couple, return to their townhouse in a fashionable area of London before midnight, so they can keep their tradition of celebrating the new year with a midnight toast. Jane worries because Robert has joined the City of London Imperial Volunteers (CIV) as an officer, and will soon be leaving to serve in the Second Boer War. The Marryots' butler Alfred Bridges has joined the CIV as a private and is also leaving soon. His wife Ellen, the Marryots' maid, worries about what will become of her and their new baby Fanny if Alfred is killed or seriously injured. At midnight, the Marryot and Bridges families ring in the new century while Cook dances with other revelers in the street. While Robert is away at war, Jane's friend Margaret Harris keeps her company and gives her emotional support. Robert and Alfred return home unharmed and Robert is knighted for his service.

Alfred announces that he has bought his own pub with money partly provided by Robert, and he and Ellen will be leaving service and moving to a flat. As the downstairs staff have a cup of tea to celebrate Alfred's return, they receive news of the death of Queen Victoria.

A few years later, Alfred has developed alcoholism and is managing the pub poorly. Ellen plans a genteel social evening when Jane Marryot and her son Edward, who is now in college at Oxford, pay a visit to the Bridgeses' flat. Ellen does not tell Alfred about the visit and lies to the Marryots that he can't attend due to a leg injury. Alfred shows up drunk, acts rudely and destroys a doll that Jane had given Fanny, causing Fanny to run away. Alfred chases Fanny into the street, where he is fatally run over by a horse-drawn fire engine.

The following year, Ellen and Fanny Bridges encounter the Marryot family at the seaside, where Ellen and Fanny are living off the proceeds from the pub, now owned by Ellen. Fanny has become a talented dancer and singer. Edward Marryot has fallen in love with his childhood playmate Edith Harris. The family witnesses the historic flight by Louis Blériot over the English Channel. Edward and Edith marry and subsequently die in the Sinking of the RMS Titanic.

Robert and Joe Marryot both serve as officers in World War I. While on leave, Joe reconnects with Fanny Bridges, now a performer in a nightclub. Fanny and Joe fall in love and Joe spends most of his leave time with her, unbeknownst to his parents. He proposes, but she hesitates to accept due to the difference in their social classes. Just after armistice is announced in 1918, Ellen reveals the affair to Jane and demands that Joe marry Fanny when he returns. While Jane and Ellen argue, Jane receives a telegram informing her that Joe has been killed in battle.

The film ends on New Year's Day 1933, with Jane and Robert, now elderly, carrying on their tradition of celebrating the new year with a midnight toast to their memories, as well as to the future.

Cast

 Diana Wynyard as Jane Marryot
 Clive Brook as Robert Marryot
 Una O'Connor as Ellen Bridges
 Herbert Mundin as Alfred Bridges
 Beryl Mercer as Cook
 Irene Browne as Margaret Harris
 Tempe Pigott as Mrs. Snapper
 Merle Tottenham as Annie
 Frank Lawton as Joe Marryot
 Ursula Jeans as Fanny Bridges
 Margaret Lindsay as Edith Harris
 John Warburton as Edward Marryot
 Billy Bevan as George Grainger
 Ronnie James as Desmond Roberts
 Dick Henderson, Jr. as Master Edward
 Douglas Scott as Master Joey
 Sheila MacGill as Young Edith
 Bonita Granville as Young Fanny
 Claude King as Speaker
 Brandon Hurst as Actor (uncredited)
 Will Stanton as Tommy Jolly (uncredited)

Production
Fox Movietone newsreel cameramen were sent to London to record the original stage production as a guide for the film adaptation.

Frank Borzage was originally going to direct, but he departed in June 1932 to work on another project. Fox production head Winfield Sheehan decided to use a British director due to the film's setting, and Frank Lloyd was brought on board. Production took place from early October to November 29, 1932.

The film was one of the first to use the words "damn" and "hell", as in "Hell of a lot". These had been used in the play. There was concern at the Hays Office that this could set a precedent. Fox president Sidney Kent was quoted saying the mild profanity "could not offend any person; and, after all, that was the real purpose of the Code. And as far as the use creating a precedent which might be followed by other producers is concerned, the best answer would be that anyone who could make a picture as good as Cavalcade might be justified in following the precedent."

The film premiered in New York City on January 5, 1933, but did not go into general theatrical release until April 15.

Soundtrack
In addition to several original compositions by Coward, more than fifty popular songs, national anthems, hymns, ballads, and topical tunes relevant to the years portrayed were used in the film. Songs appearing in the film include:

 "Girls of the C.I.V.", "Mirabelle", "Lover of My Dreams", and "Twentieth Century Blues", all by Noël Coward 
 "God Save the Queen"
 "Auld Lang Syne" by Robert Burns
 "Goodbye, Dolly Gray" by Will D. Cobb and Paul Barnes
 "Soldiers of the Queen" by Leslie Stuart
 "Land of Hope and Glory" by Edward Elgar
 "A Bird in a Gilded Cage" by Arthur J. Lamb and Harry von Tilzer
 "Emperor Waltz" by Johann Strauss II
 "I Do Like to Be Beside the Seaside" by John A. Glover-Kind
 "Take Me Back to Yorkshire" by Harry Castling and Fred Godfrey
 "The Blue Danube" by Johann Strauss II
 "Nearer, My God, to Thee" by Lowell Mason
 "I'll Make a Man of You" by Arthur Wimperis and Herman Finck
 "Your King and Country Want You" by Paul Rubens
 "It's a Long Way to Tipperary" by Jack Judge and Harry Williams
 "Pack Up Your Troubles in Your Old Kit-Bag and Smile, Smile, Smile" by Felix Powell and George Asaf
 "Keep The Home Fires Burning" by Ivor Novello and Lena Guilbert Ford
 "Oh, You Beautiful Doll" by Nat Ayer and Seymour Brown
 "Mademoiselle from Armentières (Hinky Dinky Parley Voo)" by Irwin Dash, Al Dubin, and Joe Mittenthal
 "When Johnny Comes Marching Home" by Louis Lambert
 "Over There" by George M. Cohan

Reception
Cavalcade was an instant commercial success, earning $1,004,000 in North American rentals, and $3.5 million in worldwide rentals. It made over US$1 million in the UK. It ended up making an estimated profit of £2,500,000 during its initial theatrical release.

Mordaunt Hall of The New York Times called the film "most affecting and impressive" and added, "In all its scenes there is a meticulous attention to detail, not only in the settings ... but also in the selection of players ... It is unfurled with such marked good taste and restraint that many an eye will be misty after witnessing this production."

It was reportedly Adolf Hitler's favorite film.

The film holds a 67% approval rating on the review aggregation website Rotten Tomatoes based on 36 reviews, with an average rating of 5.90/10. The site's consensus reads: "Though solidly acted and pleasant to look at, Cavalcade lacks cohesion, and sacrifices true emotion for mawkishness."

Awards and honors
Cavalcade won the Academy Award for Best Picture, Frank Lloyd won the Academy Award for Best Director, and the Academy Award for Best Art Direction went to William S. Darling. Diana Wynyard was nominated for the Academy Award for Best Actress but lost to Katharine Hepburn for Morning Glory.

Cavalcade was the first film produced by Fox Film Corporation to win the Best Picture Oscar, and the only one before it merged with 20th Century Pictures in 1935 to form 20th Century Fox.

Preservation
The Academy Film Archive preserved Cavalcade in 2002.

Home media
Cavalcade was released on a US VHS in 1993.

Cavalcade was initially released on DVD December 7, 2010, as the earliest entry in the 75-film, three-volume  "Twentieth Century Fox 75th Anniversary Collection", a prestige set with an initial list price of nearly $500. With the DVD and Blu-ray releases of Wings on January 24, 2012, Cavalcade became the only Best Picture Oscar winner not available on a stand-alone DVD in Region 1.

It was eventually released separately on a US Blu-ray/DVD set on August 6, 2013, after it received the most write-in votes in a Fox online poll.

The film is also available for rental or purchase in HD on various US-restricted digital services.

, these are the only official home video releases of Cavalcade anywhere, though several bootlegs are available, most notably a poor-quality DVD and BD-R from Spain.

References

Bibliography
 Glancy, H. Mark.When Hollywood Loved Britain: The Hollywood 'British' Film 1939–1945. Manchester University Press, 1999.

External links

 
 
 
 
 Cavalcade at Turner Classic Movies
 Cavalcade on Lux Radio Theater: December 28, 1936

1933 films
1933 drama films
Fox Film films
American drama films
Best Picture Academy Award winners
American black-and-white films
1930s English-language films
Drama films based on actual events
American films based on plays
Films directed by Frank Lloyd
Films set in 1899
Films set in the 1900s
Films set in the 1910s
Films set in the 1920s
Films set in the 1930s
Films set in London
Films whose art director won the Best Art Direction Academy Award
Films whose director won the Best Directing Academy Award
Films set around New Year
Films with screenplays by Sonya Levien
Films scored by Arthur Lange
1930s American films